Solipuram Madhusudhan Reddy (popularly known as S M Reddy) was born on 15 October 1940 to Smt. Peddamma and Sri. Laxma Reddy in Errambelli village of Valigonda mandal, Nalgonda district, Telangana, India

He earned his bachelor’s in botany (1963), took his master's degree in botany from Osmania University (1965) and Ph.D. degree from Jai Narain Vyas University (1968). He did post-doctoral research in the Institute of Microbiology, Prague, Czechoslovakia during 1978-79 and visited different laboratories in Eastern Europe.

He guided more than 30 research students of Ph.D. degree and published more than 350 research papers in various journals. He is a fellow of Indian Phytopathological Society, Indian Society of Mycology and Plant Pathology, Indian Botanical Society and A. P. Academy of Sciences. He is also on the Editorial Board of various research journals.

Retired botany professor of Kakatiya University, S.M. Reddy has been elected President of Indian Botanical Society for the year 2016.  He took charge on October 27 as president at the annual conference of the society held at University of Rajasthan, Jaipur from Prof. Ashok Bhatnagar of University of Delhi.

He authored and co-authored books in botany, microbiology, and plant pathology.

References

20th-century Indian botanists
Indian mycologists
1940 births
Living people